A censure, in the canon law of the Catholic Church, is a medicinal and spiritual punishment imposed by the church on a baptized, delinquent, and contumacious person, by which he is deprived, either wholly or in part, of the use of certain spiritual goods, until he recover from his contumacy.

History and development

The name and general nature of this punishment date from the Roman Republic. With the ancient Romans, in the year A.U.C. 311, we find established the office of public censor (censores), whose functions were the keeping of a register (census) of all Roman citizens and their proper classification, e.g., senators, knights, etc. Furthermore their functions were the disciplinary control of manners and mores, in which their powers were absolute, both in sumptuary matters and in the degradation of any citizen from his proper class, for reasons affecting the moral or material welfare of the State. This punishment was called censure (censura). As the Romans were jealous in preserving the dignity of their citizenship, so also was the Church solicitous for the purity and sanctity of her membership, i.e., the communion of the faithful. In the early church the faithful in communion with her were inscribed in a certain register; these names were read in public gatherings, and from this list were excluded those who were excommunicated, i.e., put out of the communion. These registers were called diptychs or canons, and contained the names of the faithful, both living and dead. The Canon of the Mass still preserves traces of this ancient discipline.

Excommunication was then the generic term for all coercive remedies used against delinquent members of the Church, and there were as many kinds of excommunication as there were grades of communion in the Christian society, either for the laity, or for the clergy. Then also, as now, some goods of the Church were common to all its members e.g., prayer, the sacraments, presence at the Holy Sacrifice, and Christian burial. Other goods again were proper to the various grades of clerics. Whoever was deprived of one or all of these rights, came under the general designation of excommunicated, i.e., one placed outside the communion to which his grade in the Church entitled him, either wholly or in part. In earlier ecclesiastical documents therefore, excommunication and similar terms did not always mean censure, or a certain species of censure, but sometimes meant censure, sometimes poena, as explained below, and very often penance. In the later Roman legal terminology (Codex Theod. I tit. I, 7 de off. rector. provinc.) we find the word censure used in the general sense of punishment. Accordingly the Church, in the early ages, used this term to designate all her punishments, whether these were public penances, excommunications, or, in the case of clerics, suspension or degradation. In her ancient penal legislation, the Church, like the Roman State, looked on punishment as consisting, not so much as the infliction of positive suffering, as in the mere deprivation of certain goods, rights, or privileges; these in the Church were spiritual good and graces, such as participation with the faithful in prayer, in the Holy Sacrifice, in the sacraments, in the general communion of the Church, or, as in the case of clerics, in the rights and honours of their office.

Legal developments of the Jus novum
Some centuries later, however, in the period of the Decretals, we note a great advance in legal science. In the schools and in the courts, a distinction was made between internal and external forum, the former referring to matters of sin and conscience, the latter to the external government and discipline of the Church. The different kinds and the nature of punishments were also more clearly defined by commentators, judges, and doctors of law. In this way, from the beginning of the thirteenth century, although not expressly so stated in the decretals, the term censure became the equivalent of a certain class of ecclesiastical penalties, i.e., interdict, suspension, and excommunication. Innocent III, who in 1200 had used the term for punishment in general, at a later date (1214), answering a query as to the meaning of ecclesiastical censure in pontifical documents, expressly distinguished censure from any other ecclesiastical penalty (respondemus quod per eam non solum interdicti, sed suspensionis et excommunicationis sententia valet inteligi), thereby authentically declaring that by ecclesiastical censure were meant the penalties of interdict, suspension, and excommunication. Furthermore, in accordance with the internal nature of these three penalties, glossators and commentators, and in their wake later canonists introduced and maintained the distinction, still universally recognized, between medicinal or remedial punishments (censures) and vindictive punishments. The primary scope of the former is the correction or reformation of the delinquent; this being properly accomplished, they cease. Vindictive punishments (poenæ vindicativæ), while not absolutely excluding the correction of the delinquent, are primarily intended to repair violated justice, or to restore the social order of justice by the infliction of positive suffering. Such are corporal and pecuniary punishments, imprisonment and seclusion for life in a monastery, deprivation of Christian burial, also the deposition and degradation of clerics as well as their suspension for a definite period of time. (Suspension latæ sententiæ, e.g., for one or for three years, is a censure, according to St. Alphonsus, Th. Mor. VII, n. 314.) Confession penances are vindictive punishments, their chief purpose being, not reformation, but reparation, and satisfaction for sins. The irregularity arising from a crime is not a censure, nor is it a vindictive punishment; in fact, it is not a punishment at all, properly speaking, but rather a canonical impediment, an inability to support the honour of the sacred ministry, which forbids the reception of orders, and the exercise of those received.

The matter of censures was seriously affected by the Constitution "Ad vitanda" of Martin V in 1418. Prior to this constitution, all censured persons, known to be such by the public, were to be avoided (vitandi) and could not be communicated with in divinis or in humanis, i.e., in religious or in civil intercourse. A censure, being a penal withdraw of the right of participating in certain spiritual goods of the Christian society, was of course something relative, that is, it affected the person thus enjoined and also the persons who participated with him in the use of these goods. In this way the sacraments or other spiritual services could not be accepted from a suspended cleric. But, by virtue of the Constitution of Martin V, only those censured persons were in the future to be considered and treated as vitandi who were expressly and specifically by name declared to be such by a judicial sentence. The S. Cong. Inquis. (9 Jan. 1884) declared this formality unnecessary in the case of notorious excommunicates vitandi for the reason of sacrilegious violence to clerics. Nor is the validity of the denunciation restricted to the locality where it takes place (Lehmkuhl, II, n.884). On the other hand, Martin V expressly declared that this relaxation was not in favor of the censured party, so that the tolerati really gained no direct privilege, but was only in favor of the rest of the faithful, who could henceforth communicate with tolerated excommunicates, and, as far as the censure was in question, could deal with them as non-censured persons—all this on account of the grave changes in social conditions. (See EXCOMMUNICATION.) In 1869 Pius X modified seriously the ecclesiastical discipline in the matter of censures by his Constitution "Apostolicæ Sedis Moderatoni" (q.v.) which abrogated many latæ sententiæ censures of the common law, changed others (thus reducing their number), and made a new list of common law censures latæ sentiæ.

Nature of the penalties
The Catholic Church believes that it receives the power to enforce these conditions directly from Jesus Christ.  It also believes that it has the right to make disciplinary laws to govern its members, and that such right would be meaningless if it had no way of enforcing the observance of canonical laws. Moreover, from its very origin, the church has used this right to enforce its laws, as the church interprets in the action of St. Paul against the incestuous Corinthian and against Hymeneus and Alexander. 

The end for which the Church is striving is the eternal salvation of the faithful ("The salvation of souls is the supreme law"). In dealing with delinquent members therefore she seeks principally their correction; she wishes the reformation of the sinner, his return to God, and the salvation of his soul. This primary effect of her penalties is often followed by other results, such as the example given to the rest of the faithful, and, ultimately, the preservation of Christian society. On the Divine principle, therefore, that God does not desire the death of the sinner, but that he should be converted from his ways and live (Ezechiel, xviii, 23), the Church has always inclined to the infliction of censures, as medicinal or remedial in their nature and effects, rather than to vindictive punishments, which she uses only when there is little or no hope for the sinner himself.

It follows, then, that the primary and proximate end of censures is to overcome contumacy or willful stubbornness in order to bring back the guilty person to a better sense of his spiritual condition; the secondary and remote end is to furnish an example of punishment in order that other evil-doers may be deterred. Contumacy is an act of stubborn or abstinent disobedience to the laws; but it must imply contempt of authority; i.e., it must not only be directed against the law, but must also, generally express contempt for the punishment or the censure attached to the law. (Lehmkuhl, Cas. Consc., Freiburg, 1903, no. 984.) Ignorance of the threatened punishment or grave fear would, therefore, generally excuse a person from incurring censure; under such circumstances there can be no question of real contumacy. Since contumacy implies abstinent persistence in crime, in order to become liable to these punishments a person must not only be guilty of crime, but must also persist in his criminal course after having been duly warned and admonished. This warning (monitio canonica), which must precede the punishment, can emanate either from the law itself or from the ecclesiastical superior or judge. Contumacy can therefore occur in one of two ways: first, when the delinquent does not heed the warning of his ecclesiastical superior or judge, addressed to him personally and individually; second, when he violates a law of the Church with full knowledge of the law, and of the censure attached, in the latter case the law itself being a standing warning to all (Lex interpellat pro homine).

Censures, being a privation of grave spiritual benefit, are inflicted on Christians only for a sin internally and externally grave, and in genere suo, i.e., in its own kind, or that contemplated by the censure, perfect and complete. There must be a just proportion between the crime and the penalty. Being medicinal, the punishment of a censure consists, not in depriving the delinquent of the spiritual goods themselves, but only of the use of the spiritual goods, and this, not perpetually, but for an indeterminant time, i.e., until he repents, in other words, until the patient is convalescent from his spiritual illness. Hence excommunication, being by far the gravest of censures, is never inflicted for a certain definite time; on the other hand, suspension and interdict, under certain conditions, may be inflicted for a definite time. The real punishment of ecclesiastical censures consists in the privation of the use of certain spiritual good or benefits. These spiritual goods are those which are within the power of the Church or those which depend on the Church, e.g., the sacraments, public prayers, Indulgences, sacred functions, jurisdictions, ecclesiastical benefices and offices. Censures, however, do not deprive of grace, nor of the private prayers and good works of the faithful; for, even if censured, the eternal communion of the saints still remains by virtue of the indelible character imprinted by baptism. Thus, to distinguish the various effects of the three censures: Excommunication may be inflicted on clerics and laymen and excludes from the communion of the faithful, prohibits also the use of all spiritual goods in which the faithful participate as members of the visible body whose visible head is the Roman Pontiff. Suspension is for clerics only, leaves them participating in the communion of the faithful, but directly prohibits them from the active use of sacred things, i.e., as ministers (qua ministri), and deprives them of some or all of the rights of the clerical state, e.g., jurisdiction, the hearing of confessions, the holding of office, etc. Interdict prohibits the faithful, either clerics or laymen, from the passive use of some ecclesiastical goods, as far as these are sacred things (res sacræ) or as far as the faithful are participants, e.g., certain sacraments, Christian burial, etc.

Division

Censures a jure and ab homine
Besides the particular division of censures into excommunication, suspension, and interdict, there are several general divisions of censures. First censures a jure and ab homine. Censures a jure (by the law) are those inflicted by a permanent edict of the lawgiver, i.e., which the law itself attaches to a crime. We must distinguish here between a law, i.e., an enactment having, of itself, permanent and perpetual binding force, and a mere command or precept, usually temporal in obligation and lapsing with the death of the superior by whom it was given. Censures a jure, therefore, are annexed either to the common law of the Church, such as decrees of popes and general councils, or are inflicted by general law, e.g., by bishops for their particular diocese or territory, usually in provincial or diocesan synods. Censures ab homine (by man) are those which are passed by the sentence, command, or particular precept of the judge, e.g., by the bishop, as contradistinguished from the law described above. They are usually owing to particular and transient circumstances, and are intended to last only as long as such circumstances exist. The censure ab homine may be in the form of a general order, command, or precept, binding on all subjects, or it may be only by a particular command or precept for an individual case, e.g., in a trial where the delinquent is found guilty and censured, or as a particular precept to stop a particular delinquency.

Censures  and 
Another division of censures is important and peculiar to the penal legislation of the Church. A censure a jure or ab homine may be either (1)  or (2) .

(1) Censures  (of sentence pronounced) are incurred  by the commission of the crime; in other words, the delinquent incurs the penalty in the very act of breaking the law, and the censure binds the conscience of the delinquent immediately, without the process of a trial, or the formality of a judicial sentence. The law itself inflicts the penalty in the moment when the violation of the law is complete. this kind of penalty is especially effective in the Church, whose subjects are obliged in conscience to obey her laws. If the crime be secret, the censure is also secret, but it is binding before God and in conscience; if the crime be public the censure is also public; but if the secret censure thus incurred is to be made public, then a judicial examination of the crime is had, and the formal declaration (declaratory sentence) is made that the delinquent has incurred the censure.

(2) Censures  (of sentence awaiting pronouncement) are so attached to the law or to the precept that the delinquent does not incur the penalty until, after a legal process, it is formally imposed by a judicial or condemnatory sentence. The expressions most commonly used in the censure  are: , etc. If however, the expressions are of the future, and imply judicial intervention, the censure is  e.g., etc. In doubtful cases, the sentence is presumed to be , because in penal matters the more benign interpretation is to be followed. Moreover, before the infliction of the latter kind of censures, three warnings are necessary, or one peremptory warning, except when both the crime and the contumacy of the delinquent are notorious and therefore sufficiently proved.

Censures are again divided into reserved and non-reserved censures. As sins may be reserved, so also may censures, reservation in this case being limited to limitation or negation of an inferior's jurisdiction to absolve from the censure, and the retention of this power by his superior. (See Reservation).

Requirements for censures

For the infliction of censures, either a jure or ab homine, are required: 
Jurisdiction in the legislature or the judge; 
sufficient cause; 
correct method of procedure. 
As to jurisdiction, since censures belong to the external forum or external government of the Church, it necessarily follows that for their infliction, either by law or by judge, jurisdiction or power to act in this forum is required. Sufficient cause moreover, must be had for the infliction of a censure. A censure, as a sanction of the law, is an accessory to the law; therefore a substantial defect in the law, e.g., injustice or unreasonableness, modifying the law, nullifies also the censure attached to the law. This sufficient cause for a censure may be lacking in the law, either because in its formulation the legal order was not observed, or because the fault considered in the law was not sufficiently grave to justify the penalty of ecclesiastical censure. The penalty must be in proportion to the crime. If in the legislative act the legal order was observed, but the proportion of punishment to crime was lacking, i.e., if the offense did not justify the extreme penalty attached to the law, then as the law has two parts, it is sustained in the first part, i.e., the precept, but not in the second, i.e., the penalty or censure. In doubt, however, both law and penalty are presumably valid. As to the correct method of procedure, a sentence of censure may be void if any substantial rule of procedure is not observed, e.g., the warnings in a censure inflicted ab homine. The censure is valid, however, if there be any objective proportion between the gravity of the penalty and the gravity of the fault, even if the sentence have some accidental defect, e.g., a censure inflicted through hatred for a person who, however, is a transgressor, or if some other accidental rule of procedure has not been observed. A question arises concerning censures invalid in foro interno ("in the external forum") or according to truth, but valid in foro externo or according to presumption of law. For instance, a person is convicted of a crime in foro externo to which a censure is attached, but in his conscience he knows himself to be innocent. What are the effects of a censure thus inflicted? Having been found guilty in foro externo, the censure has valid effects in that forum and must be observed externally, to avoid scandal and for good discipline. All acts of jurisdiction in foro externo of such a censured party might be declared invalid. But in foro interno he would possess jurisdiction, and, should there be no danger of scandal, he could act as though uncensured without incurring the penalty of violating the censure, e.g., irregularity. A censure may also be inflicted conditionally; if the condition is fulfilled, the censure is valid.

Can censures be inflicted as vindictive penalties, i.e., not primarily as remedial measures, but rather to avenge a crime? This is a graver question, and canonists has sought to solve it by an interpretation of certain texts of the law, chiefly from Decretum of Gratian. These laws, however, contemplate the earlier discipline of censures, when the name was applied to punishments in general, without any specific signification. It is evident, therefore, that the solution must now be sought in positive law. In the law of the Decretals, no express decision of the question is to be found, although the species of penalties are there more accurately distinguished. In later law, the Council of Trent, (Sess. XXV, c. iii, De ref.) most wisely warns bishops that the sword of censures is to be used only with sobriety and with great circumspection. Censures, being essentially a deprivation of the use of spiritual goods or benefits, are to be inflicted medicinally, and should therefore be lifted as soon as the delinquent recedes from his contumacy. We have seen above that St. Alphonsus and other authors after him, hold that secondarily, a censure mat have punitive and deterrent motive, and from that point of view, may be inflicted for a given time. This is generally speaking, for while it is certain that excommunication can never be thus inflicted as a vindictive punishment, suspension and interdict can be inflicted, rarely and for a short period, as vindictive penalties by positive law. The reason of this is that suspension and interdict do not, like excommunication, cast the delinquent out from the communion of the faithful, neither do they deprive him absolutely of all spiritual goods; they may, therefore, for grave reasons take on the nature of vindictive penalties. This is especially true when their effect is the privation of some temporal right, e.g., when a cleric is suspended from his office or benefice; for whenever censures deprive primarily of the use of temporal goods, they are rather punishments properly so called than censures, whose primary character is the deprivation of the use of spiritual goods

Subject of censures, active and passive

As regards the active subject of censures, i.e., who can inflict them, censures belong to the external government of the Church. They can therefore be inflicted only by those who have proper jurisdiction in the external government of the church, called the "external forum". Censures a jure, i.e., incorporated into laws binding Christian society, in whole or in part, can be passed by him who has the power to thus legislate. Thus the pope or a general council can inflict such censures on the whole world, the Roman congregations in their own spheres, the bishop within his own diocese, the chapter or vicar capitular during the vacancy of a see (sede vacante), regular prelates having external jurisdiction, legates of the Holy See, also chapters of regulars over their own subjects. Parish priests, abbesses, and secular judges, however, have no such power. Censures ab homine, or inflicted by an ecclesiastical judge, whether his jurisdiction be ordinary or delegated, can be inflicted to enforce a certain law, or to prevent certain evils. Vicars-general and delegated judges not having legislative power cannot inflict censures a jure, but only ab homine, in order to assert and protect their power, e.g., to enforce the execution of a judicial decree. Censures, being spiritual punishments, can only be inflicted on Christians, i.e. baptized persons. Moreover, being punishments, they can only be inflicted on the subjects of the superior inflicting the censure; such subjection may arise from domicile, quasi-domicile, or by reason of the crime committed (ratione delicti). Pilgrims violating a particular law are not subject to censure, but if they transgress the common law with a censure ferendæ sentientiæ attached, the latter can be inflicted on them by the local bishop. Cardinals and bishops are not subject to censures a jure (except excommunication) unless in the law express mention be made of them. The pope alone can judge heads of state. Kings and sovereigns cannot be censured by bishops, nor can communities or chapters be excommunicated by them. However, a community can suffer interdict and suspension, only in that case, it would not be a censure, properly speaking, but rather a penal privation; ceasing to be a member of the community, one would cease to undergo the penalty.

Absolution from censures

All canonists agree in this, that a censure once incurred can only be taken away by absolution. Although censures are medicinal punishments and are destined to overcome contumacy, they do not cease at once upon repentance. As the sentence was a judicial act, so there is required a judicial absolution, lawfully given when there is amendment. Not even the death of the censured party, if excommunicated or interdicted, would remove the censure, because even in this case there would still remain some of the effects of the censure, e.g., the privation of Christian burial. The only case in which formal absolution would not be required is when a censure is inflicted with a conditio resolutiva, e.g., suspension pending the performance of a certain act. When suspension or interdict are inflicted as vindictive punishments, not being censures properly so called, they may cease, not by absolution, but by lapse of the time for which they are inflicted. Censures themselves, i.e., not yet incurred, cease by the abrogation of the law to which they were annexed, by revocation, or (usually) by the death of the superior, if issued ab homine as a particular precept.

Absolution, which is the loosing or relaxation of the penalty by competent authority, is an act of justice, and a res favorabilis in censures, and hence cannot be denied to a penitent censured person. It can be given in two ways: (1) In the internal forum, that is, for the sin and hidden censure. This can be given by any priest having the necessary jurisdiction; can be given in confession or outside of confession, in what is called the forum of conscience (forum conscientiæ). In either case, however, the formula used is that of the sacramental absolution referring to censures. (2) In the forum externum absolution can only be given by those vested with the necessary judicial power, i.e., by the one who inflicted the censure, his successor, delegate, or his superior, e.g., the pope. The formula used here is either the solemn one or the shorter formula, as the occasion demands; both are found in the Roman Ritual. Absolution can be given either absolutely or conditionally, i.e., depending on the fulfillment of some condition for its validity. It is also given ad cautelam (for safety's sake) in all rescripts, Bulls, and Apostolic privileges, lest the effects of the concession be impeded by some hidden censure. Lastly, we have absolution ad reincidentiam; this takes effect immediately, but if the penitent, within a certain time, does not do something prescribed, he at once occurs, ipso facto, a censure of the same kind as that from which he had just been absolved. He who takes away the censure can impose the reincidentia. Today there is only a reincidentia ab homine, i.e., although sometimes called for and provided for in the law. it must be applied ab homine, i.e., by the absolving person (Lega, lib II, vol. III, nos. 130-31).

In regard to the question of the minister of absolution, or who can absolve from censures, we have the general principle: "only he can loose who can bind" (illius est solvere cujus est ligare); in other words, only those can absolve who have the necessary jurisdiction. This jurisdiction is either ordinary or delegated. In case of censures ab homine, by particular sentence or by way of precept, also in the case of reserved censure a jure, only he who inflicted the censure or his successor, superior, or delegate can absolve. Hence a vicar capitular can absolve from the censures passed by the ordinary power of the late bishop, having succeeded to the power held by that late prelate. In regard to the power of the superior, the pope as universal superior can always remove the censures inflicted by his inferiors, bishops, etc. An archbishop, not being the absolute superior of his suffragans, but only in certain things, can remove censures imposed by his suffragans only when on visitation or in case of appeal. When, however, the superior absolves from the censure imposed by an inferior, he must in all cases notify the inferior and must demand that the delinquent give him full satisfaction. The extent of the power of a delegated judge to absolve must be clearly stated in his letters.

When censures are passed a jure communi or ab homine by a general sentence, if these censures be not reserved, any approved confessor having jurisdiction to absolve from sin may absolve from them both in the external and the internal forum, the absolution in the one forum being valid in the other, except when the censure has been carried to the forum contentiosum, i.e., is already in litigation before a court, in which case the absolution of the internal forum would not hold for the external. A priest not approved or not having jurisdiction to hear confessions cannot absolve from censures, even if not reserved, except in danger of death. Lastly, when censures are reserved a jure no one can absolve except the one to whom to whom they are reserved, or his superior, successor, or delegate. Censures which are reserved to the pope are either simply reserved or reserved in a special manner. In relation to the former, the Council of Trent (Sess. XXIV, c. vi, De ref.) formulated the common law according to which a bishop or one delegated by him can absolve, in foro conscientiæ and in his own diocese, his subjects from these censures when the crime is occult and not notorious, or when it has not been brought before a judicial tribunal. By bishops are here meant also abbots having ecclesiastical territory, vicars capitular, and others having episcopal jurisdiction; not, however, vicars general in virtue of their general commission, nor regular prelates. The subjects for whom these faculties may be used are those who live in the bishop's diocese, or outsiders who come to confession in his diocese, these being his subjects in view of the absolution to be imparted. Such absolution, however, cannot be given in foro externo, but is limited to the forum conscientiæ, i.e., to the domain of conscience. If censures are reserved to the Roman Pontiff in a special manner, a bishop by his ordinary power cannot absolve, except in case of necessity. Special concessions for these cases are, however, given to the bishops by the Holy See for a certain time, or for the life of the bishop, or for a certain number of cases. Censures which are reserved by pontifical law to bishops or ordinaries can be absolved by all bishops, abbots, vicars capitular and vicars-general, in any forum, and even in notorious cases. At the point of death (in articulo mortis), any priest, even if not approved, can absolve from all censures, but also all absolution from them as governed by the provision of the aforesaid papal Constitution (Pius IX, 1869), "Apostolicæ Sedis Moderationi."

Conditions for absolution

These conditions affect both the priest who absolves and the person absolved. The absolution of a priest is invalid if obtained by force or if extorted by grave, unjust fear. Furthermore the absolution would be invalid if the principal, moving cause be false, e.g., if the judge absolves precisely because alleges that he has already made satisfaction, when in reality he has not done so. The conditions to be absolved are generally expressed in the above-mentioned formula, injunctis de more injungendis, i.e., enjoining those things which the law requires. These are: (1) satisfaction to the offended party; (2) that the delinquent repair the scandal according to the prudent judgment of the bishop or confessor and remove the occasion of sin, if there be any; (3) that, in the case of one absolved from censures specially reserved, he promise (in foro externo, on oath) to abide by the further direction of the Church in the matter (stare mandatis ecclesiæ); (4) sometimes also, in graver crimes, an oath is required not to perpetrate them again; (5) that apart from the penance imposed in confession, the absolved person receive and perform some other salutary penance as a satisfaction for this fault.

References

Notes

Bibliography
 
 

Catholic penal canon law
Excommunication